Inverlochy Castle Hotel, formerly known as Inverlochy Castle, is a 19th-century baronial mansion near Fort William, Scotland. It is located about two miles away from the 13th century Inverlochy Castle, after which it was named.  This is a baronial mansion was built in 1863 by William Scarlett, 3rd Baron Abinger, soon after succeeding his father as Baron Abinger in 1861. Queen Victoria spent a week at Inverlochy during an 1873 visit to Balmoral, remarking "I never saw a lovelier or more romantic spot". The house and estate were sold in 1944 to a Canadian entrepreneur, Joseph Hobbs, the owner of the nearby Ben Nevis distillery. Upon inheriting the estate, Hobbs' son converted the house into a hotel, which opened for the first guests in 1969.

It was voted the number 17 "best hotel in Europe" by Travel + Leisure magazine in 2001.

References

External links 
 Inverlochy Castle Hotel

Castles in Highland (council area)
Hotels in Highland (council area)
Category B listed buildings in Highland (council area)
Listed castles in Scotland
Listed hotels in Scotland
Fort William, Highland
1863 establishments in Scotland
Buildings and structures completed in 1863
Scottish baronial architecture
Hotels established in 1969
1969 establishments in Scotland